Energy Return System (E.R.S.) is a technology created by American sportswear company Reebok where a series of cylinders composed of the plastic DuPont Hytrel are placed under the midsole of an athletic shoe. The system was introduced in 1988 to compete with Nike Air, and was gradually phased out of production upon the arrival of Reebok's Hexalite cushioning. Reebok claims that the cylinders act as springs, releasing energy after a foot strikes.

See also
 Nike Shox, similar system from Nike.
 Reebok Pump

References

Reebok